Trigoniastrum is a genus of flowering plants belonging to the family Polygalaceae.

Its native range is Tropical Asia.

Species:
 Trigoniastrum hypoleucum Miq.

References

Polygalaceae
Fabales genera